Stanisław Salmonowicz (born November 9, 1931 in Brzesc, Poland - May 24, 2022 in Toruń, Poland) is a Polish historian, professor of the Nicolaus Copernicus University in Toruń, and a member of the Polish Academy of Learning and History Institute of the Polish Academy of Sciences.

He specializes in the history of law, Polish history from the time of the Polish Enlightenment to World War II, and history of Polish-German relations. He has been described as one of the premier Polish authorities in the field of the history of law.

Biography
Salmonowicz was born on 9 November 1931 in Brzesc nad Bugiem. He got his doctorate in law in 1959 at the University of Warsaw. His thesis was about a city of Toruń lawyer Krystian Bogumił Steiner (1746–1814). In 1959 he began working at the Jagiellonian University, where he finished his habilitation in 1966 with a thesis about criminal law of the enlightened absolutism era.  From that year he moved to Nicolaus Copernicus University in Toruń, where he served as the vice dean.  In 1970 due to his ties to another historian, Paweł Jasienica, he was arrested for anti-governmental activism by the Polish communist authorities of the People's Republic of Poland and fired from the university in the next year. In 1972 he began work at the History Institute of the Polish Academy of Sciences where he would work until 2003. From 1981 he resumed his work at the University of Toruń. In 1983 he received the rank of special professor (nadzwyczajny) and in 1989, the higher rank of the regular professor (zwyczajny). He has also served as a guest lecturer at a number of universities outside Poland.

He received a medal for "Deeds for City of Toruń" (Za Zasługi dla Miasta Torunia) and the Cross of Freedom and Solidarity in 2012.

Selected works
Salmonowicz has published about 1,200 works, including over 40 books, including a number of textbooks.

 Krystian Bogumił Steiner: 1746-1814: toruński prawnik i historyk: studium z dziejów nauki prawa doby Oświecenia w Polsce (1962)
 Francja pod jakobińską gwiazdą: szkice z dziejów rewolucji francuskiej (1966)
 Prawo karne oświeconego absolutyzmu: z dziejów kodyfikacji karnych przełomu XVIII-XIX w. (1966)
 Toruńskie Gimnazjum Akademickie w latach 1681-1817. Studium z dziejów nauki i oświaty (1973)
 O reglamentacji obyczajowości mieszczańskiej w Toruniu w XVI - XVIII wieku (1976)
 Obrońcy i miłośnicy języka polskiego w Toruniu XVI-XVIII w. (1979)
 Fryderyk II (1981)
 Myśl Oświecenia w Toruniu (1982)
 Toruń w czasach baroku i oświecenia: szkice z dziejów kultury Torunia XVII-XVIII wieku (1982)
 Konfederacja warszawska 1573 (1985)
 Prusy: dzieje państwa i społeczeństwa (1987)
 Ludzie i dzieło Sejmu Czteroletniego (1988)
 Sylwetki spod gilotyny (1989)
 Ludwik Muzyczka 1900-1977: polityk i żołnierz: przyczynek do dziejów Armii Krajowej (1992)
 Od Prus Książęcych do Królestwa Pruskiego: studia z dziejów prusko-pomorskich (1992)
 Szkice toruńskie XVII-XVIII wieku (1992)
 Polacy i Niemcy wobec siebie : postawy, opinie, stereotypy (1697-1815): próba zarysu (1993)
 Wokół listu 34 (1994)
 Polskie Państwo Podziemne: z dziejów walki cywilnej 1939-45 (1994)
 Historia ustroju Polski (1995, with Ryszard Łaszewski)
 Studia historycznoprawne (1995)
 O rzemiośle recenzenta : studia z warsztatu historyka (1999)
 Polski wiek XX: studia i szkice (2000)
 Z wieku oświecenia: studia z dziejów prawa i polityki XVIII wieku (2001)
 Historia ustrojów państw (2001, with Grzegorz Górski)
 Prusy Królewskie w XVII-XVIII wieku : studia z dziejów kultury (2002)
 Niewesołe lata 1939-1989: szkice z Polski dziejów najnowszych (2005)
 W staropolskim Toruniu (XVI-XVIII w.): studia i szkice (2005)
 Kilka minionych wieków: szkice i studia z historii ustroju Polski (2009)
 Studia z historii prawa (XVI-XX wiek) (2010)

References

External links
 Homepage at IHPAN
 List of publications

1931 births
Living people
Academic staff of Nicolaus Copernicus University in Toruń
Writers from Brest, Belarus
People from Polesie Voivodeship
Adam Mickiewicz University in Poznań
Polish male non-fiction writers
Members of the Polish Academy of Learning
Historians of Poland